Emmy is a feminine (sometimes also masculine) given name.

Orthographic variants include Emme, Emmi and Emmie.  
The name is in many instances a hypocoristic of either Emma (itself being in origin a hypocoristic of a number of ancient Germanic names beginning in Ermen-) or Emily, or Emmanuel (Emmanuelle). 
It came to be used as a separate (rare) German name, given officially in Germany from the later 19th century. 

As an officially given feminine name, Emmy ranked 66th in Sweden and 89th in France as of 2010.
Emmy is rarely also encountered as a surname.

Notable people with the name include:

 Emmy Andriesse (1914–1953), Dutch photographer
 Emmie Charayron (born 1990), French triathlete
 Emmy Krüger (1886-1976), German operatic soprano 
 Emmy Loose (1914-1987), Austrian operatic soprano
 Emmie te Nijenhuis (born 1931), Dutch ethnomusicologist
 Emmy Noether (1882–1935), Bavarian Jewish mathematician
 Emmy Okello (born 1977), Ugandan consultant physician
 Emmie Owen (1871-1905), English opera singer and actress
 Emmy Stradal (1877–1925), Austrian politician
 Emmy Verhey (born 1949), Dutch violinist
 Emmy Wehlen (1887–1977), German actress
 Emmy Werner (1929–2017), American developmental psychologist

As a familiar form of Emma
 Emmy Bridgwater (1906–1999, born Emma Frith Bridgwater), English artist and poet
 Emmy Göring (1893-1973, born Emma Johanna Henny Sonnemann), German actress
 Emmy Hennings (1885–1948, born Emma Maria Cordsen), German performer and poet

As a familiar form of Emilie
 Emmy Destinn (1878–1930, born Emílie Pavlína Věnceslava Kittlová), Czech operatic soprano

As a familiar form of Emmanuel/Emmanuelle
 Emmy Bezzina (born 1945), male Maltese politician
 Emmy Rossum (born 1986 as Emmanuelle Grey Rossum), American actress

Other
 Emmy Clarke (born 1991 as Mary Elizabeth Clarke), American actress

Fictional characters
 Emmy Altava, the character from the Professor Layton series
Granny (Looney Tunes), the Looney Tunes character nicknamed Emmy in Hare Trimmed
 Emmy, the main character from the PBS animated preschool television series Dragon Tales

See also
 Emi (disambiguation)
 Emy (disambiguation)

References

Feminine given names
Hypocorisms